Martín Trejo (born 9 November 1993) is an Argentine badminton player, and now works as national coach.

Achievements

BWF International Challenge/Series 
Men's doubles

  BWF International Challenge tournament
  BWF International Series tournament
  BWF Future Series tournament

References

External links 
 

Living people
1993 births
Argentine male badminton players
Badminton coaches